Saarwellingen is a municipality in the district of Saarlouis in Saarland, Germany. As of 2019 it has a population of 13,242.

References

External links
 

Saarlouis (district)